Gérard Desrosiers,  (1919 – 1 December 2016) was a Canadian  physician and the founder of the first regional library in Quebec.

In 2006, he was named Grand officer (grand officier) of the Ordre national du Québec (GOQ) for his work in founding libraries in the area of the Mauricie region of Quebec.

References

M. Gérard Desrosiers est nommé Grand Officier de l'Ordre national du Québec 

1919 births
2016 deaths
Physicians from Quebec
Canadian librarians
Grand Officers of the National Order of Quebec
Université Laval alumni